Rhys Ward (born September 6, 1989) is a Canadian actor. He is best known for his roles as Adam Darrow in The Returned, and Jason Martin in And Now a Word From Our Sponsor. He also played Atom in The 100.

Career 
Rhys Ward and Ally Sheedy recently starred in the independent feature film titled, Criminal Seduction days after wrapping up a role as Atom in The CW series The 100.
He had a recurring role on CW's iZombie as Cameron and also starred as Adam Darrow in the show The Returned. He has made a few movies with Lifetime.

Filmography

References

External links 

 http://www.thespec.com/whatson-story/4135457-ancaster-s-rhys-ward-is-making-a-name-for-himself-by-being-the-bad-guy/

Canadian male film actors
Canadian male child actors
Male actors from Hamilton, Ontario
Canadian male television actors
1989 births
Living people